Jacqueline Courtney (born Sharon Courtney; September 24, 1946 – December 20, 2010) was an American actress best known for her work on daytime soap operas.

Courtney's initial appearance on television came in 1951 when she performed on WAAT in Newark.

After short stints on The Edge of Night and Our Five Daughters, Courtney became famous for her role as Alice Matthews Frame on Another World; she played the role from the show's debut in May 1964 until July 1975. It was during the late 1960s that the Alice/Steve/Rachel triangle became one of the hottest storylines on daytime, pairing her with George Reinholt as the charismatic Steve Frame,  and setting her in a rivalry with "bad girl" Rachel Davis, played at the time by Robin Strasser and later by Victoria Wyndham.

In 1975, Courtney and Reinholt were fired, allegedly for "storyline purposes." Head writer Harding Lemay wrote in his memoir, Eight Years in Another World, that Courtney was fired because she was a bad actress who refused to learn lines as written, although she had huge popularity with the soap audience. After being dismissed by producer Paul Rauch, Courtney went on to play Pat Ashley on ABC's One Life to Live, where she was reunited with George Reinholt, playing Tony Lord. In 1979, just as Courtney was involved in a storyline involving a psychotic twin sister, Maggie, Robin Strasser joined the cast as Dorian Lord. Courtney remained on the show until September 1983, when the network fired her just before bringing Paul Rauch in as producer.

Courtney reconciled her differences with Another World and started back on the show as Alice on the 20th anniversary show in May 1984. She played the role until the next year when she was let go due to lack of story for the character. In 1989 she returned for the show's 25th anniversary and for Mackenzie Cory's funeral. After a small role as madame Diane Winston on Loving in 1987, Courtney retired from acting, though she appeared, alongside Reinholt, on the TV special 50 Years of Soaps: An All-Star Celebration in 1994.

Courtney died on December 20, 2010, aged 64, from metastatic melanoma. She was survived by a daughter, Jennifer, by her marriage to Carl Desiderio. 

In 1973, Courtney received Best Actress, Single Performance, recognition in The First Annual Afternoon TV Writers And Editors Awards.

Television

The Edge of Night (Kitty DeMarco) [1958]
The Edge of Night (Viola Smith) [1961]
Our Five Daughters (Ann Lee) [1962]
This Is the Life episode "Karen's Fears" [1962]
Route 66 episode "Same Picture, Different Frame" [1963]
The Doctors [1963]
Route 66 episode "Follow the White Dove with the Broken Wing" [1964]
Another World (Alice Matthews Frame) [1964–1975, 1984–1985, 1989]
One Life to Live (Patricia Kendall) [1975–1983]
Loving (Diane Winston) [1987–1988]

References

1946 births
2010 deaths
Actresses from New Jersey
American soap opera actresses
Actors from East Orange, New Jersey
Deaths from melanoma
Deaths from cancer in Michigan
21st-century American women